Jusso Könönen (born June 11, 1998) is a Finnish professional ice hockey left winger currently playing for KalPa in Liiga.

Könönen has been with KalPa since 2012, playing in their Jr. C, Jr. B and Jr. A teams before making his debut for the senior team during the 2017–18 Liiga season, playing three games and scoring one goal.

References

External links

1998 births
Living people
Finnish ice hockey left wingers
Iisalmen Peli-Karhut players
KalPa players
People from Kuopio
Sportspeople from North Savo